Claire Harman may refer to:

 Claire Harman (actress), British actress
 Claire Harman (writer), British writer and critic